Lalgadi Malakpet is a village in Medchal district in Telangana, India. It falls under Shamirpet mandal.

References

Villages in Medchal–Malkajgiri district